KTRL may refer to:

 Terrell Municipal Airport (ICAO code KTRL)
 KTRL (FM), a radio station (90.5 FM) licensed to Tarleton State University in Stephenville, Texas, United States